Nicole Justine Oliva (born 20 December 2001) is a Filipino swimmer. She competed in the women's 200 metre freestyle event at the 2017 World Aquatics Championships. and the at women's 400 metre freestyle the 2019 edition of the same tournament

Early career
A native of Santa Clara, California, Oliva was taught on swimming by a lifeguard for a decade in Cebu City in the Philippines which her family often frequented in her early years.

Oliva as a swimmer for Saint Francis High School, is a four-time CIF State Championship finalist and a three-time CIF-Central Coast Section champion. In 2019, she committed to swim for the swimming team of University of California, Berkeley starting the 2020-21 season.

International career
Oliva was one of the competitors for the Philippines at the 2018 Summer Youth Olympics in Buenos Aires. She finished sixth in the girls' 400 metre freestyle final and seventh in the girls' 200 metre freestyle final. She also had year-long training at the Santa Clara Swim Club. Oliva also swam in the heats of girls' 100 metre and girls' 800 metre freestyle.

References

2001 births
Living people
Filipino female swimmers
Place of birth missing (living people)
Southeast Asian Games medalists in swimming
Southeast Asian Games silver medalists for the Philippines
Swimmers at the 2018 Summer Youth Olympics
Competitors at the 2017 Southeast Asian Games
Sportspeople from Santa Clara, California